Jattari is a town and a Nagar Panchayat in Khair Tehsil of Aligarh district in the Indian state of Uttar Pradesh. It lies on Aligarh – Palwal road 45 km ahead from Aligarh towards Palwal. Jattari chairman is rajpal khateek sabse sateek. shubham attri rashan dealer

Demographics 
As of 2011 Indian Census, Jattari had a total population of 18,387, of which 9,793 were males and 8,594 were females. Population within the age group of 0 to 6 years was 2,800. The total number of literates in Jattari was 11,795, which constituted 64.2% of the population with male literacy of 72.8% and female literacy of 54.2%. The effective literacy rate of 7+ population of Jattari was 75.7%, of which male literacy rate was 86.4% and female literacy rate was 63.6%. The Scheduled Castes population was 3,580. Jattari had 3057 households in 2011.

 India census, Jattari had a population of 17,038. Males constituted 54% of the population and females 46%. Jattari had an average literacy rate of 58%, lower than the national average of 59.5%: male literacy was 69%, and female literacy is 45%. In Jattari, 18% of the population is under 6 years of age.

Computer institute 
Rajeev Gandhi Computer Saksharta Mission, Shanti market, Opp. Central Bank of India, Jattari
Digital Muneem Ji (Download our app now)

Schools 
1. Natkhat Kanha School, Krishna Vihar Green City, Jattari
2. Shreeji Public School
3. Babuji Convent School
4. SD International School

Nearby cities
Palwal, Aligarh, Khair, Noida, Mathura Agra, Faridabad, and Delhi.

References

Cities and towns in Aligarh district